Hartmannsdorf may refer to the following places:

In Austria 
 Markt Hartmannsdorf, in Styria

In Germany 
 Hartmannsdorf, Mittelsachsen, in Saxony
 Hartmannsdorf, Greiz, in the Greiz district, Thuringia
 Hartmannsdorf, Saale-Holzland, in the Saale-Holzland district, Thuringia
 Hartmannsdorf bei Kirchberg, in the Zwickau district, Saxony
 A part of Hartmannsdorf-Reichenau in the Sächsische Schweiz-Osterzgebirge district, Saxony
 A part of Lübben (Spreewald), Brandenburg

In Poland 
 Miłoszów, (formerly known as Hartmannsdorf) in Silesia